Events in the year 2022 in the Cook Islands.

Incumbents 

 Monarch: Elizabeth II (until 8 September); Charles III onwards
 Queen's/King's Representative: Tom Marsters
 Prime Minister: Mark Brown

Events 
Ongoing — COVID-19 pandemic in the Cook Islands

 1 August – 2022 Cook Islands general election: Citizens of the Cook Islands head to the polls to vote in a general election.
 8 September – Elizabeth II dies at Balmoral Castle, Scotland, her son and heir Charles III becomes King of the Cook Islands.
 19 September – Prime Minister Mark Brown attends the funeral of Elizabeth II.

Sports 

 28 July – 8 August: Cook Islands at the 2022 Commonwealth Games 
 18 June – 3 July: Cook Islands at the 2022 World Aquatics Championships

Deaths 

 21 July – Marjorie Crocombe, 92, Cook Islands author and academic

See also 

 History of the Cook Islands

References 

 
2020s in the Cook Islands
Years of the 21st century in the Cook Islands
Cook Islands
Cook Islands